The West Coast Conference (WCC) Women's Basketball Player of the Year is a basketball award given to the most outstanding women's basketball player in the West Coast Conference. The award has been given ever since the conference first sponsored women's basketball in the 1985–86 season, when it was known as the West Coast Athletic Conference. There have been two ties in the history of the award. The first was in 2006–07 between Stephanie Hawk of Gonzaga and Amanda Rego of Santa Clara (coincidentally, players from the same two schools were involved in a tie for the WCC Men's Player of the Year Award that season). The second was in 2020–21, when BYU's Shaylee Gonzales and Gonzaga's Jenn Wirth shared honors. There have also been a total of four repeat winners, but only one—Courtney Vandersloot of Gonzaga—has been Player of the Year three times.

No one WCC school has dominated the total awards distribution over time. The overall leader is Gonzaga, with 11 awards; BYU is next with seven, while Saint Mary's and Santa Clara have five each. Of these schools, all but BYU, which joined the WCC in 2011, have been WCC members throughout the conference's women's basketball history. Each current WCC member except for Pacific has at least one award. Pacific had been a charter member of what is now the WCC, but left in 1971, long before the conference sponsored women's sports, and did not return until 2013. The only former WCC women's basketball member that failed to produce an award winner was Nevada,  which only participated in the conference's first two women's basketball seasons (1985–86 and 1986–87).

Key

Winners

Winners by school
Note: Years of entry for each school are the actual calendar years they joined the WCC and first played women's basketball in the conference. Because the basketball season spans two calendar years, the award years reflect the years in which each season ended. Schools that have permanently left the WCC, or will leave the conference after the 2022–23 season, are highlighted in italics.

Footnotes

References
General
 Names of winners through 2010–11: 
Class years of winners through 2010–11: 

Specific

NCAA Division I women's basketball conference players of the year
Player of the Year
Awards established in 1986